Shattered Sword: The Untold Story of the Battle of Midway is a 2005 book dealing with the battle of Midway in June 1942. It won the 2005 John Lyman Book Award from the North American Society for Oceanic History for the category "U.S. Naval History".

References

2005 non-fiction books
History books about World War II
Battle of Midway